Ana Muñoz (born before 1589 – died after 1613), was a Spanish stage actress.

She married the actor-manager Antonio de Villegas in 1589, and toured as an actor and member of his company around Spain for over twenty years. She was a successful stage artist and is mentioned several times by contemporaries with admiration, among others by Agustín de Rojas. When her spouse died in 1613, she took over his theatre company and acted at its manager. She was a pioneer as a female actor, which was relatively new in Spain in the late 16th-century, as well as a female theater manager.

References 

16th-century births
17th-century deaths
Year of birth unknown
Year of death unknown
17th-century Spanish actresses
16th-century Spanish actresses
17th-century theatre managers
17th-century Spanish businesswomen
17th-century Spanish businesspeople